Chetyrman (Sıtırman) is a rural locality (a selo) in Yamadinsky Selsoviet, Yanaulsky District, Bashkortostan, Russia. The population was 188 as of 2010. There are 5 streets.

Geography 
Chetyrman is located 31 km southeast of Yanaul (the district's administrative centre) by road. Yamady is the nearest rural locality.

References 

Rural localities in Yanaulsky District